Telem (an acronym for Tenoa'a LeHithadshut Mamlakhtit (Hebrew: תנועה להתחדשות ממלכתית), lit., Movement for National Renewal) was a political party in Israel.

Background
Telem was formed on 19 May 1981 during the ninth Knesset by Moshe Dayan and two ex-Likud MKs. Dayan had been elected to the Knesset as an MK for the Alignment, which had lost the election for the first time in its history. Menachem Begin formed a coalition including his Likud party, the National Religious Party, Agudat Israel, and Dash. However, he also invited Dayan to serve as Minister of Foreign Affairs. Despite being a member of the Alignment, Begin's political rivals, Dayan accepted the post, resulting in his expulsion from his own party.

After sitting as an independent MK for some time, Dayan formed Telem in 1981, together with Yigal Hurvitz and Zalman Shoval, who had previously broken away from Likud to form Rafi – National List. On 15 June 1981, they were joined by Shafik Assad, who had left Ahva (Assad had started the Knesset session as a member of Dash, then joined the Democratic Movement before moving to Ahva).

The party won two seats in the 1981 elections, taken by Dayan and Mordechai Ben-Porat, and was invited to join the governing coalition, with Ben-Porat becoming Minister Without Portfolio. When Dayan died on 16 October 1981, he was replaced by Hurvitz. However, the party split up on 6 June 1983, when Ben-Porat created the Movement for the Renewal of Social Zionism and Hurvitz reformed Rafi – National List, which he later renamed Ometz.

A new party by the name of Telem was formed by ex-Shas MK Yosef Azran in the mid-1990s to fight the 1996 elections. However, it failed to cross the electoral threshold, and subsequently disappeared.

In 2019, a party founded by Moshe Ya'alon was named Telem in memorial of the original Telem.

Leaders

Election results

List of Knesset members

External links
Party history Knesset website

Defunct political parties in Israel
Political parties established in 1981